Izatha blepharidota is a moth of the family Oecophoridae. It is endemic to New Zealand, where it is confined to the northern half of the North Island.

The wingspan is 22.5–26 mm for males and 23–29 mm for females. Adults are on wing from November to April.

Larvae have been reared from dead branches of Pseudopanax crassifolius, dead rotten stems of Ripogonum scandens, dead branches of Coriaria arborea and dead Kunzea ericoides.

Etymology
The specific name is derived from the Greek blepharis (meaning eyelash) and the adjectival ending -ota, and refers to the delicate eyelash-like streaks in the subterminal part of the forewing.

References

Oecophorinae
Moths of New Zealand
Moths described in 2010
Endemic fauna of New Zealand
Endemic moths of New Zealand